The 1897–98 Irish Cup was the eighteenth edition of the premier knock-out cup competition in Irish football. 

Linfield won the tournament for the fifth time, defeating St Columb's Hall Celtic 2–0 in the final.

Results
Belfast-based teams were given a bye until the second round.

First round

|}

Second round

|}

Replays

|}

1 Match ordered to be replayed after Limavady protested there was no segregation on the pitch between players and spectators.

Second replay

|}

Third round

|}

1 Match ordered to be replayed after referee ended the game six minutes early.

Replay

|}

Semi-finals

|}

Replay

|}

Final

References

External links
 Northern Ireland Cup Finals. Rec.Sport.Soccer Statistics Foundation (RSSSF)

Irish Cup seasons
1897–98 domestic association football cups
1897–98 in Irish association football